The 1998 Tour de France was the 85th edition of Tour de France, one of cycling's Grand Tours. This Tour featured 189 riders on 21 cycling teams, starting in Dublin, Republic of Ireland on 11 July and finishing on the Champs-Élysées in Paris on 2 August.

Teams

Qualified teams

Invited teams

Cyclists

By starting number

By team

References

1998 Tour de France
1998